Mehke  is a village in Hsawlaw Township in Myitkyina District in the Kachin State of north-eastern Burma.

References

Populated places in Kachin State
Hsawlaw Township